The 1998 Olympic women's ice hockey tournament was the first year that featured women in ice hockey competition. It was anticipated that the women's gold medal match would feature Canada versus the United States. Canada was favored to come out on top as they had won all the competitions in previous years in women's hockey, with the United States perpetually finishing second, while no other national teams could match their level of play. However, the United States beat Canada in the final and became the first country to win gold in women's ice hockey at the Olympics.

Petra Vaarakallio scored the first-ever goal in women's ice hockey at the Olympics in 1998. She had won bronze at the 1992 World Ringette Championships but stopped playing ringette after receiving a six-month suspension for kicking an opponent who was lying on the ice.

There were no qualification tournaments, the host Japan played alongside the top five nations at the previous season's World Championships.

Rosters

Preliminary round

All times are local (UTC+9).

Final round

Bronze medal game

Gold medal game

Medalists

Final rankings

Statistics

Scoring leaders
List shows the top ten skaters sorted by points, then goals.

GP = Games played; G = Goals; A = Assists; Pts = Points; +/− = Plus-minus; PIM = Penalties in minutes; POS = Position
Source: eurohockey.com

Leading goaltenders
Only the top five goaltenders, based on save percentage, who have played at least 40% of their team's minutes, are included in this list.

TOI = Time on ice (minutes); GA = Goals against; SA = Shots against; Sv% = Save percentage; SO = Shutouts

References

External links
 Whockey – Women's Hockey 1998 Winter Olympics 
 SFRP Hockey Archine: Winter Olympic Games 1998 
 The Hockey Nut: Women's Olympic Hockey 1998 
 Hockeyarchives – Jeux Olympiques de Nagano 1998 Compétition féminine 
 – Championats du monde feminins 1997 
 la84 foundation – Nagano 1998 Official Report (182–187) 
 IIHF: Nagano 1998 in Web Archivessa 

 
Women's tournament
1998
Olympics
Women's ice hockey in Japan